Whittleford Park is a 43 hectare greenspace located between Stockingford and Camp Hill in Nuneaton, Warwickshire. Although its development as a public park by Warwickshire County Council only started in 2005 it has a long industrial history involved in coal mining and brick and tile making.

History
Surface mining was once undertaken on the site, before large collieries such as Nuneaton Colliery, Stockingford Colliery, Ansley Hall Colliery, Haunchwood Colliery took over. Tramways connected most of this pits with the local canal wharfs and the mainline railways. The final factory closed in 1970 and demolished shortly afterwards.

Areas Within Whittleford Park
Haunchwood  includes remnants of ancient woodland that used to span Barpool Valley.  It is full of silver birch, willow, coppiced hazel, oak, ash, holly and blackthorn.  In spring it is carpeted with wild garlic and bluebells.  The woods are home to varied wildlife such as squirrels, jays, foxes, green woodpeckers, muntjac deer and rabbits.

Vale View And Hawthorn Common once devoted to clay holes are now areas for sport, recreation, and are set among meadowland abundant with butterflies and bees feeding on the wild flowers and grasses.

Gorse Valley contains one of the largest areas of original bluebell woodland in the park and an area of gorse that has countryside importance.  It also has the highest view point allowing you to see the overall beauty of the park.

Barpool Valley Barpool and Whittleford brooks run through the centre of the park sustaining the wetland habitats of the flood plain.  The marshlands are one of the parks main assets.  You can literally walk through the reeds and for a moment feel like you are completely away from civilisation.

Developnment Of The Site
In 2006 Nuneaton And Bedworth Borough Council gave permission for part of the Whittleford Park site to be used for housing.Planning Permission Granted

Whittleford Park is a Site of Importance for Nature Conservation (SINC) in the Heart of England. With 63 Hectare of country park that contains Ancient Wood Land.

For the past 10 years the park that is owned by Nuneaton and Bedworth Borough Council have had a small group help to look after the park.  They have a Facebook Page called Friends Of Whittleford Park and a Blog Page

References

Nuneaton
Parks and open spaces in Warwickshire
Urban public parks